Andrew Lynn Brasher (born May 20, 1981) is a United States circuit judge of the United States Court of Appeals for the Eleventh Circuit and a former United States district judge of the United States District Court for the Middle District of Alabama. He is a former solicitor general of Alabama.

Early life and career 
Brasher received a Bachelor of Arts, summa cum laude, from Samford University, and a Juris Doctor, cum laude, from Harvard Law School, where he was a member of the Harvard Law Review and earned the Victor Brudney Prize. After law school, Brasher served as a law clerk to Judge William H. Pryor Jr. of the United States Court of Appeals for the Eleventh Circuit. He then worked in the Birmingham office of Bradley Arant Boult Cummings. In 2011, Brasher became Deputy Solicitor General of Alabama under state Attorney General Luther Strange. He was promoted to Solicitor General in February 2014. He continued to serve as Solicitor General until his appointment to be a federal district judge.

Federal judicial service

District court service 
On April 10, 2018, President Donald Trump nominated Brasher to serve as a United States district judge of the United States District Court for the Middle District of Alabama. He was nominated to the seat vacated by Judge Mark Fuller, who resigned on August 1, 2015. On June 6, 2018 a hearing on his nomination was held before the Senate Judiciary Committee. On June 28, 2018, his nomination was reported out of committee by an 11–10 vote.

On January 3, 2019, his nomination was returned to the President under Rule XXXI, Paragraph 6, of the United States Senate. On January 23, Trump announced his intent to renominate Brasher for a federal judgeship. His nomination was sent to the Senate later that day. On February 7, 2019, his nomination was reported out of committee by a 12–10 vote.

On May 1, 2019, the Senate invoked cloture on his nomination by a 52–47 vote. His nomination was confirmed that same day by a 52–47 vote. He received his judicial commission on May 3, 2019. 
He was sworn into office on May 7, 2019. His district court service terminated on June 30, 2020, when he was elevated to the 11th Circuit Court.

Court of appeals service 
On November 6, 2019,  President Donald Trump announced his intent to nominate Brasher to serve as a United States circuit judge of the United States Court of Appeals for the Eleventh Circuit. On November 21, 2019, his nomination was sent to the Senate. Trump nominated Brasher to the seat to be vacated by Judge Edward Earl Carnes, who had announced his intention to assume senior status on a date to be determined. A hearing on his nomination before the Senate Judiciary Committee was held on December 4, 2019. On January 3, 2020, his nomination was returned to the President under Rule XXXI, Paragraph 6 of the United States Senate. Later that day, he was renominated to the same seat. On January 16, 2020, his nomination was reported out of committee by a 12–10 vote. On February 10, 2020, the Senate invoked cloture on his nomination by a 46–41 vote. On February 11, 2020, his nomination was confirmed by a 52–43 vote. He received his judicial commission June 30, 2020, and he was sworn in the same day.

Memberships 

He was a member of the Federalist Society from 2003 to 2006 and again since 2008.

See also 
 Donald Trump judicial appointment controversies

References

External links 
 
 Appearances at the U.S. Supreme Court from the Oyez Project

|-

|-

1981 births
Living people
21st-century American lawyers
21st-century American judges
Alabama lawyers
Federalist Society members
Harvard Law School alumni
Judges of the United States District Court for the Middle District of Alabama
Judges of the United States Court of Appeals for the Eleventh Circuit
People from Milan, Tennessee
Samford University alumni
Solicitors General of Alabama
United States district court judges appointed by Donald Trump
United States court of appeals judges appointed by Donald Trump